Bruce C. Molsky (born 1955, New York City) is an American fiddler, banjo player, guitarist, and singer.  He primarily performs old-time music of the Appalachian region.

Early years
As a young man, Molsky first became interested in blues music, but eventually became absorbed in old-time music while studying engineering at Cornell University in Ithaca, New York, beginning in 1972. His playing was influenced by the fiddling of Tommy Jarrell, whom Molsky visited in North Carolina in 1976. He recorded with Bob Carlin in 1990.

Career
Molsky has released several records on Compass Records, Rounder Records and Tree Frog Music under his own name. Besides his solo recordings, he has also played in Fiddlers 4, with Darol Anger, Michael Doucet (violins) and Rushad Eggleston (cello). Since 2002, he has been a founding member of Andy Irvine & Dónal Lunny's Mozaik.

In 2008, Molsky collaborated with Norwegian hardingfele player and composer Annbjørg Lien on her album Waltz With Me and accompanied her  in subsequent concerts. He also appeared as a guest artist on Andy Statman's 2011 double-CD, Old Brooklyn (Shefa Records). He played banjo, fiddle, guitar and sang on Anonymous 4’s album 1865: Songs of Hope and Home from the American Civil War, released in 2015. Molsky was a guest on Mark Knopfler's 2015 album Tracker, playing banjo, fiddle and guitar.

Molsky is currently a member of the faculty at the Berklee College of Music, American Roots Music Program, in Boston.

Personal life
Molsky and his wife Audrey reside in Beacon, New York. He enjoys baking and began a Facebook group during the pandemic called "Fiddle and Dough." Molsky has collected fountain pens for many years.

References

External links
Bruce Molsky official site
Bruce Molsky biography on Allmusic
Bruce Molsky interview (2013)

1955 births
Living people
Old-time musicians
American banjoists
American folk singers
American male singers
People from Beacon, New York
Cornell University alumni
Jewish American musicians
American people of Ukrainian-Jewish descent
Berklee College of Music faculty
Appalachian old-time fiddlers
American fiddlers
Guitarists from New York (state)
American male guitarists
Mozaik members
20th-century American guitarists
21st-century American violinists
20th-century American male musicians
21st-century American male musicians
21st-century American Jews